Scoturopsis flaviplaga is a moth of the family Notodontidae. It is found in the Central Cordillera of Colombia in the area of Tolima.

References

Moths described in 1911
Notodontidae of South America